The Prelude and Fugue in C major, BWV 846, is a keyboard composition written by Johann Sebastian Bach. It is the first prelude and fugue in the first book of The Well-Tempered Clavier, a series of 48 preludes and fugues by the composer. An early version of the prelude, BWV 846A, is found in the Klavierbüchlein für Wilhelm Friedemann Bach.

Analysis

Prelude
The prelude is 35 bars long and consists mostly of broken chords. Below are the first four bars of the prelude:

The prelude continues like this with different variations on harmony and change of key. The prelude ends with a single C major chord.

Fugue

The fugue is 27 bars long and is written for four voices. It starts with a two-measure subject in the alto voice. The first voice to join is the soprano, which replies with the answer in the dominant key (G major).

The answer is repeated in the tenor and bass voices, respectively, when they enter. The piece then modulates through various related keys, with the subject being repeated in each of the four voices. The piece eventually ends up back in the home key. It ends with each voice stopping at a note and holding it until the end, forming a C-major chord.

Legacy

Schwencke measure

Some earlier editions of the prelude contain an extra bar between bars 22 and 23 known as the "Schwencke measure", a measure allegedly added by Christian Friedrich Gottlieb Schwencke in an attempt to correct what he or someone else erroneously deemed a "faulty" progression (though it may be accidentally corrupted manuscript(s) associated with Schwencke), even though this sort of progression was standard in the music of Bach's time.

However, according to Hermann Keller, "Schwencke was a sophisticated and well-informed musician who was probably not thinking of improving Bach."

The A may be considered as its enharmonic, G, which creates a major second step with F, but A functions as an upper leading-tone (parallel natural or descending melodic minor). Franz Kroll may have been the first to question and edit the measure, first in 1862, and the measure does not occur in Bach's student Heinrich Gerber's 1725 manuscript copy. August Halm was also critical of the measure, questioning its logic as early as 1905.

Gounod's "Ave Maria"

Charles Gounod composed a melody that was designed to be based on the prelude; a setting of that melody to Ave Maria is popular. The edition of the prelude used by Gounod contains the Schwencke measure.

20th century
Arvo Pärt's "Credo" is built around Bach's C major prelude, first unravelling it through the central cacophonous twelve-tone part of the work, then remerging on the piano with the chorus and orchestra joining in harmony for the massive finale.

Mstislav Rostropovich compared this Prelude to the introductory bars of the prelude of Bach's Cello Suite No. 1, in a video named Rostropovich interprets Bach, filmed in 1991 at the Basilique Sainte Madeleine in Vézelay, France.

"Repent Walpurgis", the last track on the debut album by progressive rock group Procol Harum contains an arrangement of the prelude by band leader Gary Brooker.

Derived works and influence on popular culture
 Douglas R. Hofstadter's "Prelude... Ant Fugue" dialogues are explicitly inspired by J. S. Bach's Prelude and Fugue in C major.
 Webber's Don't cry for me Argentina is not only based on the Prelude but also on Gounod's Ave Maria adaptation.
Maurane: Sur un prélude de Bach
Chava Alberstein, Paprarim barosh (פרפרים בראש)

Further media

Full length audio of the prelude or fugue

Excerpts

References

Further reading
Bach, Johann Sebastian. "Prelude and Fugue No. 1 in C major". The Well Tempered Clavier, Books 1 and 2. Ed. Saul Novak.

External links
Interactive media
BWV 846 Fugue (Flash) - David Korevaar performing
BWV 846-869 Prelude and Fugue (Flash) at the BinAural Collaborative Hypertext  David Korevaar, Philip Goeth, and Edward Parmentier performing

Sheet Music
 
Prelude and Fugue No. 1 in C major Sheet Music

The Well-Tempered Clavier
Compositions in C major